The Caraslău is a left tributary of the river Oituz in Romania. It flows into the Oituz north of the village Oituz.

References

Rivers of Romania
Rivers of Bacău County
Rivers of Covasna County